The 2007–08 Omani League was the 32nd edition of the top football league in Oman. It began on 7 November 2007 and finished on 9 May 2008. Al-Nahda Club were the defending champions, having won the previous 2006–07 Omani League season. On Thursday, 8 May 2008, Al-Oruba SC won 4-2 away in their final league match against Oman Club and emerged as the champions of the 2007–08 Omani League with a total of 45 points.

Teams
This season the league had 12 teams. Mjees SC and Al-Salam SC were relegated to the Second Division League after finishing in the relegation zone in the 2006-07 season. The two relegated teams were replaced by Second Division League teams Oman Club and Al-Wahda SC.

Stadia and locations

League table

Results

Season statistics

Top scorers

Media coverage

See also
2007 Sultan Qaboos Cup

References

Top level Omani football league seasons
1
Oman